James Donald Shanley (July 27, 1936 - July 10, 2019) was a halfback in the National Football League. He played for the Green Bay Packers.

References

1936 births
2019 deaths
People from Shelton, Nebraska
Green Bay Packers players
American football halfbacks
Oregon Ducks football players